Kastler is a surname. Notable people with the surname include:

Alfred Kastler (1902–1984), French physicist and Nobel Prize laureate
Daniel Kastler (1926– 2015) French theoretical physicist
Henri Kastler (1863–1957), French philatelist 
Martin Kastler (born  1974), German politician and member of the European Parliament

See also
Lycée Alfred Kastler (disambiguation)
Kastler-Brossel Laboratory, is a research laboratory specializing in fundamental physics of quantum systems
Kadison–Kastler metric, is a metric on the space of C*-algebras on a fixed Hilbert space

References